Saltanat Abilkhassymkyzy (born 14 January 2000) is a Kazakh Paralympic athlete. She made her maiden Paralympic appearance during the 2020 Summer Paralympics.

Career 

She represented Kazakhstan at the 2020 Summer Paralympics and competed in both women's 100m T35 and women's 200m T35 events.

References 

2000 births
Living people
Kazakhstani female sprinters
Cerebral Palsy category Paralympic competitors
Athletes (track and field) at the 2020 Summer Paralympics
Paralympic athletes of Kazakhstan
People from Taraz
21st-century Kazakhstani women